Cashtown is a census-designated place in Franklin Township, Adams County, Pennsylvania, United States. The community was part of the Cashtown-McKnightstown CDP, until it was split into two separate CDPs for the 2010 census. As of 2020, the population of Cashtown was 453.

A post office called Cashtown has been in operation since 1833. According to tradition, the community was named for the fact a local tavern owner required that payment be made in cash.

Geography
Cashtown is located west of Gettysburg in western Adams County. U.S. Route 30 bypasses the center of the community and forms the northern edge of the CDP. Old U.S. 30, the original Lincoln Highway, is the main street of Cashtown.

Demographics

Notable person
 Nellie V. Mark (1857–1935), physician, suffragist

References

External links
Cashtown Community Fire Dept.

Census-designated places in Adams County, Pennsylvania
Census-designated places in Pennsylvania